Chong Hwa Independent High School, Kuala Lumpur (often abbreviated as CHKL) is one of Malaysia's oldest high schools. Established in 1919 in Setapak, Kuala Lumpur, the school was a primary school. It became a high school when the school board purchased a piece of land of 24,000 square metres along Jalan Ipoh and decided to build the high school there. It has remained there ever since.

History 
After Malaysian independence, all schools in the country were asked to assimilate into the national school system. Chong Hwa High School was one of the minority of schools that decided to remain apart from that system. Being an independent school means that the school needs to sustain itself through student fees and donations from the public.

Despite the lack of government funding, the school has maintained a 100% passing rate for all government examinations since being established. The school has about 5,400 students and 300 staff members, being one of the largest high schools in Malaysia.

In 2012, the number of classes increased to 95, accommodating more than 5000 students.

The school campus includes 10 main blocks and an outdoor sport arena.

In 2018, Cheong Moey Lian became the first female principal since 1919.

Notable alumni

Political and business figures 

Lee Kim Sai (1937–2019) : Malaysia's former Health Minister and former deputy president of Malaysian Chinese Association (MCA).

Arts, cultural and media 

C.N. Liew :  Malaysian prominent contemporary artist and calligrapher, based in Hong Kong.
Nigel Ng : Malaysian stand-up comedian and YouTuber based in the UK.

Public transportation 
The school is accessible from the  Jalan Ipoh MRT Station on the Putrajaya Line. It is within walking distance from the school with Entrance B being the closest entry point to the station.

See also
 Education in Malaysia
 List of schools in Malaysia
 Chong Hwa Secondary School

External links
 Official website
 Official Facebook Page

References 

Chinese-Malaysian culture in Kuala Lumpur
Secondary schools in Kuala Lumpur
1919 establishments in British Malaya
Chinese-language schools in Malaysia
Educational institutions established in 1919